The 1968 NCAA Men's University Division Ice Hockey Tournament was the culmination of the 1967–68 NCAA University Division men's ice hockey season, the 21st such tournament in NCAA history. It was held between March 14 and 16, 1968, and concluded with Denver defeating North Dakota 4-0. All games were played at the Duluth Arena Auditorium in Duluth, Minnesota.

Qualifying teams
Four teams qualified for the tournament, two each from the eastern and western regions. The ECAC tournament champion and the two WCHA tournament co-champions received automatic bids into the tournament. An at-large bid was offered to a second eastern team based upon both their ECAC tournament finish as well as their regular season record.

Format
The ECAC champion was seeded as the top eastern team while the WCHA co-champion with the better regular season record was given the top western seed. The second eastern seed was slotted to play the top western seed and vice versa. All games were played at the Duluth Arena Auditorium. All matches were Single-game eliminations with the semifinal winners advancing to the national championship game and the losers playing in a consolation game.

Bracket

Note: * denotes overtime period(s)

Semifinals

(W1) Denver vs. (E2) Boston College

(E1) Cornell vs. (W2) North Dakota

Consolation Game

(E1) Cornell vs. (E2) Boston College

National Championship

(W1) Denver vs. (W2) North Dakota

All-Tournament Team

First Team
G: Gerry Powers* (Denver)
D: Terry Abram (North Dakota)
D: Keith Magnuson (Denver)
F: Brian Cornell (Cornell)
F: Bob Munro (North Dakota)
F: Bob Trembecky (Denver)
* Most Outstanding Player(s)

Second Team
G: Ken Dryden (Cornell)
D: Tim Gould (Denver)
D: Terry Ogden (North Dakota)
F: Dave Kartio (North Dakota)
F: Jim Wiste (Denver)
F: Tom Gilmore (Denver)

References

Tournament
NCAA Division I men's ice hockey tournament
NCAA University Division Men's Ice Hockey Tournament
NCAA University Division Men's Ice Hockey Tournament
20th century in Duluth, Minnesota
Ice hockey in Minnesota
Sports competitions in Duluth, Minnesota